The following is a list of episodes of the American television anthology series, Hallmark Hall of Fame.

(v) indicates the production is available on videocassette.
(DVD) indicates the movie is available on DVD

Seasons

Season 1 (1951–52)

Season 2 (1952–53)

{{Episode table
|background=#D4AF37 
|overall=5 | overallT=Hallmark no.
|season=5
|title=35
|airdate=16
|director=19
|episodes=

{{Episode list
| EpisodeNumber2 = 10
| EpisodeNumber = 
| RTitle = Line of Duty
| OriginalAirDate = 
| DirectedBy =  Albert McCleery
| LineColor = D4AF37
}}

}}

 Season 3 (1953–54)

 Season 4 (1954–55)

 Season 5 (1955–56)

 Season 6 (1956–57)

 Season 7 (1957–58)

 Season 8 (1958–59)

 Season 9 (1959–60)

 Season 10 (1960–61)

 Season 11 (1961–62)

 Season 12 (1962–63)

 Season 13 (1963–64)

 Season 14 (1964–65)

 Season 15 (1965–66)

 Season 16 (1966–67)

 Season 17 (1967–68)

Season 18 (1968–69)

 Season 19 (1969–70)

 Season 20 (1970–71)

 Season 21 (1971–72)

 Season 22 (1972–73)

 Season 23 (1973–74)

 Season 24 (1974–75)

 Season 25 (1975–76)

 Season 26 (1976–77)

 Season 27 (1977–78)

NOTE: Hallmark's #128 was "Peter Pan", a rerun of #121. The date and season have not been established.

 Season 28 (1978–79)

 NOTE: Hallmark #132 was the last episode to air on NBC.

 Season 29 (1979–80)

 NOTE: Hallmark #133 was the first episode to air on CBS.

 Season 30 (1980–81)

 Season 31 (1981–82)

 Season 32 (1982–83)

 Season 33 (1983–84)

 Season 34 (1984–85)

 Season 35 (1985–86)

 Season 36 (1986–87)

 Season 37 (1987–88)

 Season 38 (1988–89)

 Season 39 (1989–90)

 Season 40 (1990–91)

 Season 41 (1991–92)

 Season 42 (1992–93)

 Season 43 (1993–94)

 Season 44 (1994–95)

 Season 45 (1995–96)

Season 46 (1996–97)

Season 47 (1997–98)

Season 48 (1998–99)

Season 49 (1999–2000)

Season 50 (2000–01)

Season 51 (2001–02)

Season 52 (2002–03)

Season 53 (2003–04)

Season 54 (2004–05)

Season 55 (2005–06)

Season 56 (2006–07)

Season 57 (2007–08)

Season 58 (2008–09)

Season 59 (2009–10)

Season 60 (2010–11)

On May 6, 2011, CBS announced that they had cancelled the Hallmark Hall of Fame from their network.

Season 61 (2011–12)

Season 62 (2012–13)

Season 63 (2013–14)

From this point onward, all episodes will be seen exclusively on the Hallmark Channel.

Season 64 (2014–15)

Season 65 (2015)

Season 66 (2016–17)

Season 67 (2017–18)

Season 68 (2018–19)

Season 69 (2019–20)

See also
 List of Hallmark Channel Original Movies (and Category)
 List of programs broadcast by Hallmark Channel (and Category)

References

External links
 
 

Lists of American drama television series episodes
Lists of anthology television series episodes